The Germany national long track team is the national long track motorcycle racing team of Germany and is controlled by the Deutscher Motor Sport Bund.

Competition

Riders 
Riders who started in Team Long Track World Championship Finals:

 Matthias Kröger (2007, 2008, 2009, 2010)
 Gerd Riss (2007, 2008, 2009)
 Stephan Katt (2007, 2008, 2010)
 Enrico Janoschka (2007, 2009)
 Richard Speiser (2009, 2010)
 Bernd Diener (2008)
 Martin Smolinski (2010)

See also 
 Germany national speedway team

External links 
 (de) Deutscher Motor Sport Bund website

National long track teams
Long track
Team